Pizza Time is a pizzeria located in St. Augustine, Florida considered the second-highest rated pizzeria in the United States as of 2015 after Juliana's Pizza. The pizzeria opened in 2005 by Domenico Conslignarnio.

See also
 List of Italian restaurants

References

External links
 

Italian-American culture in Florida
Italian restaurants in the United States
Restaurants in Florida
St. Augustine, Florida
Pizzerias in the United States
Restaurants established in 2005
2005 establishments in Florida